M. Zahid Hasan is the Eugene Higgins Professor of Physics at Princeton University. His primary research area is quantum physics and quantum topology.

Biography
Born in Dhaka, Bangladesh, Hasan completed his higher secondary schooling at Dhanmondi Government Boys' High School and Dhaka College, then studied physics and mathematics at the University of Texas at Austin. He obtained his Ph.D. in 2002 from Stanford University, working at SLAC/Stanford National Accelerator Laboratory and Brookhaven National Laboratory. 

After a term as a Robert H. Dicke Fellow in fundamental physics at Princeton and visiting appointments at Bell Labs (in Murray Hill, New Jersey), SLAC/Stanford National Accelerator Laboratory and Lawrence Berkeley National Laboratory, Hasan joined the faculty rank at Princeton University. 

Hasan is the Principal Investigator of Laboratory for Topological Quantum Matter and Advanced Spectroscopy at Princeton University and a Visiting Faculty Scientist at Lawrence Berkeley National Laboratory in California Since 2014 he has been an EPiQS-Moore Investigator, awarded by the Betty and Gordon Moore foundation in Palo Alto (California) for his research on emergent quantum phenomena in topological matter. He has been a Vanguard Fellow of the Aspen Institute (Washington DC) since 2014. Hasan is an elected fellow of the American Academy of Arts and Sciences.

Research 
Hasan's research is focused on fundamental physics - either searching for, or in-depth exploration of novel phases of electronic quantum matter. He co-proposed and co-led the scattering-spectroscopy MERLIN beam-line and end-station facility at the Lawrence Berkeley National Laboratory. and developed a laboratory for ultrafast and coherent quantum phenomena at Princeton University.

References 

Living people
Princeton University faculty
Stanford University alumni
Year of birth missing (living people)